Lad mag was a term principally used in the UK in the 1990s and early 2000s to describe a then-popular type of lifestyle magazine for younger, heterosexual men, focusing on "sex, sport, gadgets and grooming tips". The lad mag was notable as a new type of magazine; previously, lifestyle magazines had been almost entirely bought by women. It was the central cultural component of 1990s lad culture. The  rapid decline of the lad mag in the late 1990s/early 2000s is generally associated with the rise of the Internet which provided much of the same content for free.

Emergence of lad mags
Through the 1980s efforts were made to create a market for lifestyle magazines for younger men, without success: magazines such as Cosmo Man and The Hit were short lived failures. In 1994, linked to the wider development of lad culture, two new magazines found a formula that worked: IPC's Loaded and EMAP Metro's FHM. Both magazines were selling hundreds of thousands of copies shortly after launch/relaunch.

Status as pornography
Reporting on multiple studies of the content of lad mags, academics Coy and Horvath reported in 2011 that that the "prominent themes are of female nudity and self-centred pleasure seeking." A 2005 study of the content of the magazine Nuts found each issue typically had over 70 images of women with a third topless. Nonetheless lad mags were generally accepted as not pornography: even Coy and Horvath writing in the journal Feminism and Psychology are careful to state that they recognise "the differences between lad mags and pornography".

Similarly, in UK law, the lad mags were not pornography. That meant photos of women's naked breasts could be shown in the magazines (though not on the cover, only inside the magazine) but not full nudity. This was a critical issue for sales: unlike pornographic magazines, lad mags could be sold to under 18s and did not have to be placed on the top shelf of newsagents, out of the reach of children. Instead they were typically positioned on the shelves at a central position, in the lifestyle category.

The covers of lad mags typically showed a very scantily dressed woman. A contributing factor to the decline of the magazines was successful anti-sexism campaigns in the early 2010s. Campaigners persuaded major newsagents that—due to the highly sexualized images of women  on the covers—the magazines needed to be sold in opaque bags.

In gender studies
The lad mag was at the time seen as distinct from magazines targeted at the stereotypical new man. Contrasting the two gender constructs, Tim Edwards, a sociologist at the University of Leicester, describes the new man as pro-feminist, albeit narcissistic, and the new lad as pre-feminist, and a reaction to second-wave feminism.  The new man image failed to appeal to a wide readership whereas the more adolescent lad culture appeals more to the ordinary man, says Edwards. Edwards also points out that lad culture men's magazines of the 21st century contain little that is actually new. Referring to a study of the history of Esquire magazine, he observed that there is little substantially different between the new man Arena and GQ and the new lad Loaded. Both address assumed men's interests of cars, alcohol, sport, and women, and differ largely in that the latter have a more visual style. From this he infers that "the New Man and the New Lad are niches in the market more than anything else, often defined according to an array of lifestyle accessories", and concludes that the new lad image dominates the new man image simply because of its greater success at garnering advertising revenue for men's magazines.

See also
List of men's magazines
Lad lit

References

Lifestyle magazines published in the United Kingdom
1990s fads and trends
2000s fads and trends